Timbaland & Magoo were a rap duo consisting of producer/rapper Timothy "Timbaland" Mosley and rapper Melvin "Magoo" Barcliff, formed in 1989. Hailing from Norfolk, Virginia, the duo first met when they were teenagers. They later paired up as a duo and released their debut album Welcome to Our World, spawning their highest-charting single "Up Jumps da Boogie". They released two more studio albums as a group, Indecent Proposal in 2001 and Under Construction, Part II in 2003. The latter was meant as a sequel to Missy Elliott's fourth album Under Construction. 

In August 2021, Blackground Records, the label who launched R&B/Pop singer Aaliyah, signed a distribution deal with Empire Distribution to re-release Timbaland & Magoo's catalogue on CD, cassette and vinyl, onto digital download sites and, for the first time ever, streaming services. As a result, Timbaland's 1998 LP Tim's Bio: Life from da Bassment and Timbaland & Magoo albums Welcome to Our World, Indecent Proposal and Under Construction, Part II were re-released August 27, 2021.

Discography

Albums

Singles

Guest appearances by Magoo

1994
Jodeci – "What About Us (Swing Mob Mix)"

1995
DeVante Swing - Gin & Juice (Remix) featuring Da Boogie Man, Mr. Brendal, Timbaland, Black, Static & C-Dub

1996
Ginuwine – "G. Thang"

1997
Missy Elliott – "Beep Me 911"

1998
Missy Elliott – "Beep Me 911 (Timbaland Remix)"
Timbaland – "Here We Come"
Timbaland – "What 'Cha Talkin' About"
Playa - "Intro (Interlude)"
Playa – "Derby City (Interlude)"

2003
The Black Russians – "Back Up Out My Way"

2007
Timbaland – "Boardmeeting"

2011
Timbaland – "Magoo Verse (Timbaland Thursday)"

2013
Missy Elliott – "Warped"

References

Musical groups established in 1995
African-American musical groups
American hip hop groups
Hip hop duos
American musical duos